Jamaica competed at the 2022 Winter Olympics in Beijing, China, from 4 to 20 February 2022.

Jamaica's team consisted of seven athletes (six men and one woman) competing in two sports. Benjamin Alexander and Jazmine Fenlator-Victorian were the country's flagbearer during the opening ceremony. Meanwhile bobsledder Ronaldo Reid was the flagbearer during the closing ceremony.

Competitors
The following is the list of number of competitors participating at the Games per sport/discipline.

Alpine skiing

Benjamin Alexander has met the basic qualification standards meaning that Jamaica has qualified one male alpine skier.

Bobsleigh

Jamaica qualified three sleds (two-man, four-man and the women's monobob). By qualifying three sleds, Jamaica also earned five athlete quota spots (five men and one woman). This will mark the first time Jamaica has qualified in three events in bobsled. Jamaica's four-man bobsled qualified for their first games since Nagano 1998.

* – Denotes the driver of each sled

See also
Tropical nations at the Winter Olympics

References

Nations at the 2022 Winter Olympics
2022
Winter Olympics